Our Lady & St John Catholic College is a mixed 11-16 comprehensive school in Blackburn, Lancashire, England.

The school was created in 1987 by the amalgamation of Notre Dame Grammar School and St. John Rigby R.C. High School. A purpose-built Vocational Centre opened in September 2009.

Attainment
In 2009, 69% of Year 11 students achieved 5 A*-C GCSE passes. The school's value-added measure was 1011 in 2007 (national average 1000).

Alumni

Notre Dame High School
 Polly James, actress who played Beryl Hennessey in The Liver Birds
 Matt Derbyshire, professional footballer

References

Secondary schools in Blackburn with Darwen
Catholic secondary schools in the Diocese of Salford
Educational institutions established in 1987
1987 establishments in England
Voluntary aided schools in England
Schools in Blackburn